Salvador Bernárdez (6 January 1954 – 18 July 2011) was a Honduran international football midfielder.

Club career
Nicknamed Pichini and Pólvora, Bernárdez played his entire career for F.C. Motagua in the Honduran league. He was the Honduran league's top goalscorer in the 1978/79 season and still is the 9th best scorer for Motagua of all time with 36 goals.

International career
Bernárdez has represented Honduras in 9 1982 FIFA World Cup qualification matches, helping them to qualify for their first World Cup Finals tournament. He did however not make the final squad for Spain 1982 due to injury. He went on to earn 14 caps, scoring 5 goals.

International goals
Scores and results list Honduras' goal tally first.

Retirement
He coached Barcelona a U-15 Boys competitive team for one season. He moved to the United States in the 1980s.

Personal life and death
Bernárdez' father Víctor also played for Motagua in the 1940s and 1950s. Salvador was married to Julia Maritza Gracia. 

He died at the age of 58 in San Francisco, California from a heart attack.

Honours
 Motagua
 1978–79

 Individual
 Top goalscorer with Motagua in 1978–79

References

External links
 En Estados Unidos falleció “Pichini” Bernárdez - Honduras Fútbol 

1950s births
2011 deaths
People from La Ceiba
Association football midfielders
Honduran footballers
Honduras international footballers
F.C. Motagua players
Liga Nacional de Fútbol Profesional de Honduras players
Honduran emigrants to the United States